The KAI KF-21 Boramae (formerly known as KF-X)  is a South Korean-led fighter aircraft development program with the goal of producing an advanced multirole fighter for the South Korean and Indonesian air forces. The airframe is stealthier than any fourth-generation fighter, but does not carry weapons in internal bays like fifth-generation fighters, though internal bays may be introduced later in development.

The program is led by the South Korean government, which holds 60% of the program's shares. Indonesia took a 20% stake in the program in 2010, and the remaining 20% are held by private partners including the manufacturer Korea Aerospace Industries (KAI). The KAI KF-X is South Korea's second domestic fighter jet development program, following the FA-50.

In April 2021, the first prototype was completed and unveiled during a rollout ceremony at the headquarters of KAI at Sacheon Airport. It was officially given the name Boramae (Korean: 보라매, "young hawk" or "fighting hawk"). The first test flight was conducted on 19 July 2022, with manufacturing scheduled to begin in 2026. At least 40 aircraft are planned to be delivered by 2028, with South Korea expecting to deploy a total of 120 of the aircraft by 2032. It will also be available for export market.

In Indonesia, the KF-X development program is referred to as the IF-X program. The Jakarta Globe reported that the completed aircraft will receive the designation F-33.

Background

The KF-X advanced multirole jet fighter project, intended to produce modern warplanes to replace South Korea's aging F-4D/E Phantom II and F-5E/F Tiger II aircraft, was first announced in March 2001 by South Korean President Kim Dae-jung at a graduation ceremony of the Korea Air Force Academy. Research and development (R&D) requirements were determined by the Joint Chiefs of Staff in 2002. The project was felt to be extremely ambitious, with the Korea Institute for Defense Analyses (KIDA, a defense ministry think tank) doubtful of the country's ability to complete the complicated project.

The development phase had numerous delays and postponements and its economic cost was debated, but the project received renewed interest following a 2008 feasibility study and attacks by North Korea in 2010. Although the project carried risks and the expected per-unit cost would be significantly higher than purchasing from foreign manufacturers, the development of the domestic defense industry was deemed to be of national importance and was expected to have a ripple effect on high-tech industries.

On 15 July 2010, a partnership was made with Indonesia, which would provide 20% of the funding for the KF-X project, cooperate with technological development through state-owned Indonesian Aerospace, and purchase 50 of the approximately 150–200 aircraft anticipated to be produced. Turkey had also considering joining with a 20% share, but wanted more control than South Korea had offered. The South Korean government committed to 60% of the cost. The remaining 20% was provided by domestic and foreign companies. Korean Aerospace Industries (KAI) won the production bid, and partnered with Lockheed Martin for technological support. The contract formed a plan for delivery of the aircraft to begin in 2026.

On 27 July 2022 Polish Armaments Agency said it is closely watching the development of KF-21 Boramae, potentially paving a way for purchase of future Block 2 version of the fighter jet.

Design and development

The initial goal for the program was to develop a single-seat twin-engine 
multirole fighter with stealth capabilities exceeding both the Dassault Rafale and Eurofighter Typhoon but less than those of the Lockheed Martin F-35 Lightning II. The Weapon Systems Concept Development and Application Research Center of Konkuk University advised that the KF-X should be superior to the F-16 Fighting Falcon, with 50% greater combat range, 34% longer airframe lifespan, better avionics, active electronically scanned array (AESA) radar, more-effective electronic warfare, and data link capabilities. The project requirements were later downgraded by the Republic of Korea Air Force (ROKAF) to a 4.5 generation fighter with limited stealth capabilities.

South Korea possessed 65% of the necessary technology to produce the KF-X, and sought cooperation from other countries. To facilitate technology transfer, the Agency for Defense Development (ADD) proposed two primary concepts for the KF-X: C103, which resembled the F-35; and C203, which resembled European fighters with forward canards (the design chosen would depend on whether a development deal was reached with the US or European partners).

The C501 ( KFX-E) was a third design, proposed by KAI and supported by the Defense Acquisition Program Administration (DAPA), which attempted to reduce costs with a smaller, single-engine fighter, but it had inferior performance to the F-16 and was unsuitable for the large airspace of Indonesia. ROKAF preferred the benefits of a twin-engine design, with better combat performance and safety, and a larger airframe with room for upgrades. These upgrades could lead to a future reclassification as a fifth-generation fighter, while the C501 was closer to fourth generation.

When the development team started designing the KFX in December 2015, research and design were conducted based on the C103 configuration. Upon receiving the basic drawings of the C103, C104, and C105 from ADD, the development team built an experimental model of the C105 and began a wind tunnel experiment on the newly designed C107, which increased the size of the aircraft and increased the max takeoff weight. After about 2 years of various wind tunnel experiments, in 2018, the C109 proposed by ADD and KAI was decided to be the prototype design of KFX.

Lockheed Martin agreed to transfer two dozen F-35A technologies as part of a purchase deal. However, the US government blocked the transfer of four vital technologies: AESA radar, infrared search and track (IRST), electro-optical targeting pod (EO TGP), and radio frequency jammer (RF jammer) technology. South Korea was thus required to develop these technologies domestically. A 2015 audit estimated that 87% of technologies for the project had been secured. The preliminary design was finalized in June 2018. In September 2019, a critical design review examined 390 technical data sets and confirmed that the KF-X was adequate to ROKAF's requirements.

Budget

R&D expenditures

In an agreement signed at the end of 2015, Indonesia agreed to provide 20% of the development costs, KAI would provide an additional 20%, and the Korean government would support the remainder.

Indonesian investment
On 15 July 2010, the Indonesian government agreed to fund 20% of the KF-X project cost in return for one prototype, design participation, technical data, and production sharing. On 2 August 2011, a joint research center was opened in Daejeon, South Korea. The second agreement between Indonesia and Korea was a work assignment agreement between KAI and Indonesia's state-owned aerospace manufacturer PT Dirgantara (PTDI). As per this agreement, PTDI sent 100 engineers to South Korea to take part in the structural design of KF-21 and play a role in its development over time.

In November 2017, Indonesia, through state-owned Indonesia Aerospace, failed to pay its share in the latest round of development costs, prompting criticism from South Korea. As of 2019, Indonesia was renegotiating its involvement in the program. FlightGlobal reported in July 2019 that Indonesia was exploring payment in Indonesia-produced armaments instead of cash. By July 2019, Indonesia was approximately  billion in arrears.

According to a September 2020 report, Indonesia had paid only US$10 million since 2016 on research and development stage and owed about US$420 million. Another report stated that Indonesia paid US$205 million for research and development and owed about US$420 million. In December 2020, a report showed that Indonesia was likely to pull out of the project,  while another stated that South Korea and Indonesia plan to move forward the KFX/IFX project.

In August 2021 Indonesia reaffirmed its interest in the KF-21 program, with Indonesian engineers returning to South Korea to continue their work. Further agreement on the costs has been reached between the two countries.

According to reports on 24 May 2022, the issue of paying US$4.2 million in development costs that Indonesia did not pay has not been resolved. In November 2021, Indonesia and South Korea agreed to draw up a new sharing agreement for development costs by March 2022, but it has not been implemented so far. In November 2022, reportedly Indonesia has resumed payment for its share of the cost for a joint fighter development project.

Poland investment
On 9 December 2022, Poland expressed its intent to join the KF-21 program.

Project partners 

While KAI was the primary builder, numerous other domestic and foreign companies were contracted to provide aircraft components or support. Several of these firms had worked with KAI on the T-50. For certain sensitive technologies, such as AESA radar, EO TGP, IRST and RF jammer, foreign companies were only consulted for testing support and technical advice in order to avoid arms-trading restrictions.

Hanwha Techwin signed an agreement with General Electric to manufacture General Electric F414 engines for KF-X aircraft. According to the contract, Hanwha is to manufacture key parts, locally assemble the engines, and oversee the installation of the engine on the aircraft. The company will also support flight testing and build an extensive support system for the aircraft's operations.

AESA radar was co-developed with Hanwha Systems under the leadership of the ADD. In addition, Elta Systems helped to test the prototype hardware of the AESA radar developed by Hanwha Systems, and Saab provided technical advice to LIG Nex1, which develops Multi Function Radar (MFR) software for AESA radars.

IRST is based on the Leonardo SkyWard variant called the SkyWard-K with modified back-end and a Korean software that replaces the original program.

Integrated electronic warfare equipment including RF jammer was developed by LIG Nex1.

US aerospace contractor Texstars was selected by KAI to develop canopy and windshield transparencies for KF-X. Under the contract, Texstars will work alongside KAI to provide the KF-X fighter with birdstrike resistant transparencies with high-quality optics.

Triumph Group was selected by KAI to provide airframe mounted accessory drives (AMADs) for the KF-X. Triumph will develop and manufacture the AMADs, which transfer engine power to other systems.

 (Spanish: Compañía Española de Sistemas Aeronáuticos, CESA), a subsidiary of Héroux-Devtek, was contracted to develop the emergency braking system.

United Technologies announced in February 2018 that it was providing the environmental control system, including cabin pressurization and liquid cooling systems, as well as the air turbine starter and flow control valve.

Martin-Baker was contracted to provide the Mk18 ejection seat escape mechanism.

Cobham received contracts to provide missile ejection launchers, communications antennae, external fuel tanks, and oxygen systems.

Meggitt was contracted to provide a wheel braking system, standby flight displays, and internal sensors including a fire detection system.

MBDA was contracted to integrate the Meteor beyond-visual-range air-to-air missile (BVRAAM) onto the aircraft.

Elbit Systems was contracted by Hanwha Systems to provide terrain-following/terrain avoidance (TF/TA) systems for the aircraft.

Curtiss-Wright was contracted by KAI to Provide complete flight test instrumentation (FTI) system, it is data acquisition system (DAS) for use in flight-test campaigns.

Prototypes 
In February 2019, KAI began production work on the KF-X prototype, with six expected to be completed in 2021. These are to undergo four years of trials, and complete the development process by mid-2026. The first prototype was publicly rolled out on 9 April 2021; in addition to the six aircraft for airborne tests, two will be made for ground tests. The first test flight occurred on 19 July 2022. The aircraft bore the flags of South Korea and Indonesia and took off from Sacheon Airbase for 33 minutes. Six flying prototypes, including two two-seat versions, will conduct 2,200 flights until mass production begins in 2026. 40 Block-1 jets will have an interim capability limited to air-to-air duties, then the following 80 Block-2 jets from 2028 will add air-to-ground engagement. Later developments will include equipping the KF-21 with a domestically developed air-launched cruise missile (ALCM) and hypersonic missile.

A second KF-21 flew in November 2022 and a third in January 2023, achieving the aircraft's first supersonic flight during the month. The first two-seat KF-21 prototype flew on 20 February 2023. The two-seater’s primary role will initially be type conversion, however DAPA is considering other operational missions that would be more suited to a two-seat platform including electronic warfare.

Controversies

Foreign bribery allegations 
In October 2009, a retired ROKAF general was arrested for leaking classified documents to Saab. The general was alleged to have been given a bribe of several hundred thousand dollars for copies of a number of secret documents that he had photographed. Saab officials denied any involvement.

The Defense Security Command (DSC) found evidence that another foreign defense firm had also bribed a member of the Security Management Institute (SMI). President Lee Myung-bak believed that such corruption resulted in a 20% increase in the defense budget.

Opposition 
KIDA told a public meeting that South Korea is not technologically equipped to develop the KF-X aircraft, that the project is economically unviable and that the KF-X would not be a successful export product. It also questioned the ADD cost estimates. DAPA's estimated  trillion development cost was criticized by some analysts, who said the project could cost up to  trillion.

Defense researcher Lee Juhyeong held a seminar on the program, stating that the KF-X development would cost more than  trillion (US$9.2 billion) and could cost more than twice as much as an imported aircraft over the life of the program.

Critics noted that the KF-X would cost up to twice as much as a top-end F-16 model and that Japan had encountered a similar situation with its Mitsubishi F-2.

EADS funding pullout 
On 23 May 2013, EADS (European Aeronautic Defence and Space Company, the defense subsidiary of Airbus) offered a US$2 billion investment into the KF-X program if South Korea selected its Eurofighter Typhoon for the F-X Phase 3 fighter procurement program. The F-35A was selected instead, and EADS repeated its investment offer for a split-buy of 40 Eurofighters and 20 F-35As. But in September 2017, South Korea confirmed purchase of 40 F-35 fighter jets, causing EADS to withdraw its offer.

Postponements and delays
The KF-X project had a history of delays and postponements since its announcement in 2001. Foreign partners were sought to share costs and guarantee purchases, and several failed attempts were made to entice Sweden, Turkey, and the United States to join the project. Design concepts and requirements frequently changed while trying to appeal to prospective partners. On 1 March 2013, following the election of President Park Geun-hye, South Korea postponed the project for 18 months, due to financial issues.

On 8 February 2017, Indonesian Vice Minister of Foreign Affairs Abdurrahman Mohammad Fachir said that the KF-X project was further delayed because the US government had refused export licenses for four key F-35 technologies. This disapproval was reaffirmed in October 2015 talks, though the US military stated that there was an agreement to form an interagency working group on such issues and that the US Secretary of Defense would "think of ways for joint cooperation" with technology for KF-X.

On 1 November 2017, state-owned Indonesia Aerospace was overdue in its funding payment, which National Assembly Defense Committee member Kim Jong-Dae said would further delay or suspend the project. Kim said that the Indonesian government had disclosed its difficulty in paying and did not include the payment in its budget. However, DAPA stated that it was in talks with Indonesia regarding the payment, which would be discussed at a summit between leaders of the countries. Indonesia stated that it was an administrative error, as it was falsely thought that the payment would be made from the "side defense budget". Parliamentary approval was required to correct the error, and the payment was delivered along with a statement of hope that the program would continue without further delinquencies.

Indonesian renegotiation
On 1 May 2018, it was reported that Indonesia had complaints concerning the contract rules surrounding technical benefits and export licensing. Indonesian state media announced that the defense ministry would renegotiate the joint development program in an attempt to gain a larger share of local production, as well as export rights. The Indonesian defense ministry added that it hoped that the program would continue despite setbacks.

Renegotiation talks continued into 2019. According to the agenda of a January 2019 meeting, Indonesia sought to extend its involvement in the program to 2031, and was interested in making part of its payments in trade for Indonesian-produced defense equipment. By August, Indonesia had transport aircraft on offer along with commodities. In August 2021 Indonesia reaffirmed its commitment to the KF-21 program. Cost negotiations were finally achieved and agreed by both parties in 2021. In May 2022 it was reported that the issue of development payments had not yet been resolved. However in November 2022, it was reported that Indonesia had resumed payment for its share of the costs.

Variants

KF-21N
In September 2022, KAI unveiled a model of the KF-21N, a carrier-based version of the fighter. In May 2022, the Ministry of National Defense (MND) decided to drop funding for the CVX, a planned small aircraft carrier capable of operating STOVL F-35B jets. However, it was later clarified that the MND would consider purchasing a larger aircraft carrier design if a maritime jet fighter could be developed indigenously. Anticipating this, KAI began a preliminary design concept to make the KF-21 carrier-capable. The wings are 20% larger to ensure safety and stabilization when taking off and landing, and they fold for more compact stowage. Structural changes would make the airframe capable of CATOBAR and STOBAR operations. If the Republic of Korea Navy (ROKN) decides to procure an aircraft carrier large enough to operate fighters and identifies a requirement, KAI claims it would be able to build the KF-21N "in a few years."

Specifications

See also

 Lockheed Martin F-22
 Chengdu J-20
 Sukhoi Su-57
 Lockheed F-117 Nighthawk
 List of fifth generation fighter aircraft

References

Notes

External links

 Korea Aerospace Industries' future plan for the KFX
 Oxley Group wins development contract for KAI KF-X Fighter
 

KF-21
Proposed aircraft of South Korea
Stealth aircraft
Twinjets
Indonesia–South Korea relations
4.5-generation jet fighters